Lago di Viverone (in Piedmontese Lagh ëd Vivron) is a lake in northern Italy. Named after the town of Viverone, lies at 230 m AMSL between the districts of Biella, Vercelli and Ivrea in the area of morainic hills known as Serra. It has an area of about 6 km2 and a maximum depth of 70 m, and a perimeter of about 10.5 km. The lake is 3,500 m long and 2,600 m wide. The southern and western parts of the lake are rich in vegetation while the north part is built-up and includes hotels, camping sites and beaches.

Ducks, mallard, coots, grebes and gulls form the major part of the fauna; angling is a popular activity with catches including common whitefish, perch, tench, pike and catfish.

Viverone is a centre for day trips and the lakeside communities of Lido, Masseria, Comuna and Anzasco have recently been connected by a boat service.

The lake is also an important archaeological site: villages made up of stilt houses were present here in the Bronze Age (1300–900 BCE).

External links 

Webcam Lago di Viverone
Article on the lake at www.wakeboarditaly.com

Viverone
Metropolitan City of Turin
Province of Biella
Province of Vercelli
Waterways of Italy